Min-seo is a Korean feminine given name. In 2008 it was the 2nd-most popular given name for baby girls in South Korea, with 2,881 being given the name. Its meaning differs based on the hanja used to write each syllable of the name. There are 27 hanja with the reading "min" and 38 hanja with the reading "seo" on the South Korean government's official list of hanja which may be registered for use in given names.

People with this name include:
Chae Min-seo (born Jo Soo-jin, 1981), South Korean actress
Kim Min-seo (born 1984), South Korean actress
Kim Min-seo (badminton) (born 1987), South Korean badminton player
Minseo (singer) (born Kim Min-seo, 1996), South Korean singer and actress
Jeon Min-seo (born 2003), South Korean actress

See also
List of Korean given names

References

Korean feminine given names